Kedai Buluh is a small town in Terengganu, Malaysia.

Towns in Terengganu